Andrew Marck (born 19 November 1989) is a New Zealand Australian Baseball League outfielder and first baseman for the Auckland Tuatara of the Australian Baseball League.

Career
Marck has won the New Zealand player of the year for 5 consecutive years. He has represented New Zealand Diamondblacks Men's Baseball team in the WBC qualifiers. He has also played for NZ at junior level as well as at the U23 Australian National Championships, where he recorded a 2.00 ERA and .308 batting average. Marck has been named MVP of New Zealand's National Club Championship 3 times and led his teams to 7 national championships.

In 2011, while playing for the Carina Redsox in the Greater Brisbane League, Marck was selected on the Brisbane Bandits 22-man roster and made his debut against the Canberra Cavalry on 4 November, pitching two scoreless innings of relief. Marck struggled the rest of his time with the Bandits, posting an 8.44 ERA over eight appearances and was let go by the team.

After returning to New Zealand, Marck was part of the inaugural Auckland Tuatara team in the 2018–19 Australian Baseball League season and hit .250 in limited plate appearances as a first baseman or designated hitter. 
In the 2019–20 season, he was leading the league in average through the first five rounds, with a .412 average. In the month of January, he hit .266, but still finished the season with a respectful .333 for the season.

References

1989 births
Living people
Auckland Tuatara players
Baseball pitchers
Brisbane Bandits players
New Zealand baseball players
Sportspeople from Auckland
New Zealand expatriate baseball players in Australia